LaMar Lemmons III (born July 7, 1957) is an American politician and educator.

Career
Born in Detroit, Michigan, Lemmons was a social studies teacher in African-American studies and reading instructor. He also owned a political consulting/marketing firm. Lemmons served in the Michigan House of Representatives from 1999 until 2007 and was a Democrat. Lemmons then served on the Detroit Board of Education and was president of the board of education. His father is Lamar Lemmons, Jr. who also served in the Michigan Legislature.

References 

1957 births
Living people
Politicians from Detroit
Businesspeople from Michigan
Educators from Michigan
Members of the Detroit Board of Education
Democratic Party members of the Michigan House of Representatives